Chaman may refer to the following notable people:
Given name
Chaman Lal (born 1947), Hindi translator
Chaman Nahal, Indian born writer of English literature
Chaman Puri, Indian actor 

Surname
Clive Chaman (born 1949), Trinidad-born musician
Lauro Chaman (born 1987), Brazilian para cyclist

Other
Chaman Lal Chaman, a London-based noted Panjabi poet, lyricist and radio broadcaster